was the first Japanese astronomer to discover an asteroid. In 1900 he discovered 498 Tokio and 727 Nipponia.

The crater Hirayama on the Moon is jointly named after him and Kiyotsugu Hirayama.

References

External links 
 月の命名は？ at www12.plala.or.jp (in Japanese)

1868 births
1945 deaths
19th-century Japanese astronomers
Academic staff of the University of Tokyo
University of Tokyo alumni
20th-century Japanese astronomers